Sakarahellidae is an extinct family of gastropods belonging to the order Littorinimorpha. 

Genera:
 Sakarahella Bandel, 2006

References

 Bandel K. 2006. Families of the Cerithioidea and related superfamilies (Palaeo-Caenogastropoda; Mollusca) from the Triassic to the Recent characterized by protoconch morphology – including the description of new taxa. Paläontologie, Stratigraphie, Fazies (14), Freiberger Forschungshefte, C 511: 59-137

Littorinimorpha
Gastropod families